The Beijing–Xiong'an intercity railway or Jingxiong intercity railway is a high-speed rail that connects Beijing and Xiong'an.

It is one of two lines connecting the urban area of Beijing to the Beijing Daxing International Airport. The other line is the Daxing Airport Express of the Beijing Subway.

Opening time

Speed

Stations

References

Rail transport in Beijing
Rail transport in Hebei
Transport in Beijing
Transport in Hebei
High-speed railway lines in China
Airport rail links in China